The 1980 Lagos Classic, also known by it sponsored name Dunlop-NTC Classic, was a men's tennis tournament played on outdoor hard courts at the Lagos Lawn Tennis Club in Lagos, Nigeria which was part of the 1980 Grand Prix circuit. It was the fourth edition of the tournament and was held from 25 February until 2 March 1980. First-seeded Peter Feigl won the singles title.

Finals

Singles
 Peter Feigl defeated  Harry Fritz, 6–2, 6–3, 6–2
 It was Feigl's 1st singles title of the year and the 3rd and last of his career.

Doubles
 Bruce Nichols /  Tony Graham defeated  Kjell Johansson /  Leo Palin 6–3, 0–6, 6–3

References

External links
 ITF tournament edition details

Lagos Classic
1980 in Nigerian sport
Tennis tournaments in Nigeria
International sports competitions in Lagos
20th century in Lagos